Panthini (Village code 578306) is a village in Parkal mandal, Hanamkonda district in the state of Telangana in India. It is located to the south of the city of Warangal, and north of the village of Wardhannapet, alongside Warangal-Khammam Road.

References 

Villages in Hanamkonda district